James Denton (born January 20, 1963) is an American actor and musician. He is best known for playing Mike Delfino on ABC's comedy-drama series Desperate Housewives (2004–2012) and Dr. Sam Radford on Hallmark Channel's comedy-drama series Good Witch (2015–2021).

Early life
Denton was born January 20, 1963, in Nashville, Tennessee, and grew up in nearby Goodlettsville, the second of three children. His father, J.T. Denton (1930–1993), was a dentist who had served in the military. Denton was raised Southern Baptist and became a Minister of Music at Westmoreland United Methodist Church in Westmoreland, Tennessee.

Denton graduated from Goodlettsville High School, and attended the University of Tennessee, where he was a member of the Sigma Alpha Epsilon fraternity. He majored in Television/Journalism, and earned a degree in Advertising. Before becoming an actor, he sold advertising for two radio stations. He began acting at the age of 23, at a community theater in Nashville. He eventually moved to California to become a full-time actor. Early in his career, he was sometimes credited as Jamie Denton.

Career
While living in Chicago, Denton's first role was as "Stanley" in "A Streetcar Named Desire", and his last role was as the terrorist "Bebert" in the French farce, "Lapin Lapin". In the years that came between the two roles, Denton was a company member at The Griffin Theater and at Strawdog Theater Ensemble. He added a steady string of roles and accolades to his quickly growing list of achievements, including one of the leads in the world premiere of "Flesh and Blood", performing in and composing the music for "the Night Hank Williams Died", and his portrayal of Kentucky preacher "C.C. Showers" in "The Diviners" - which gained him a nomination for a Best Actor "Joseph Jefferson Award" (Chicago's only theater award).

After moving to Los Angeles, Denton continued to perform on stage, usually during hiatus from whichever TV series to which he was attached at the time. Several plays and independent movies in which Denton has appeared, have been written by his friend, Mike Petty. For example, "In Walked Monk", in which Denton played the role of "Steven" during the summer of 1999 and Locked Up Down Shorty's", in which he played the role of "Danny", during the summer of 2001.Denton has appeared in several films, including: That Old Feeling (1997), Face/Off (1997), and Primary Colors (1998). He has appeared in various television shows, including: Sliders, Dark Skies, Two Guys and a Girl, Ally McBeal, The West Wing, and JAG, and has had recurring roles in The Pretender, Philly, The Drew Carey Show and Reba. In 2003, he portrayed the lead role of Special Agent John Kilmer in the short-lived crime thriller series Threat Matrix.

In 2004, Denton began portraying Mike Delfino on ABC's comedy-drama television series Desperate Housewives. The show was well received by viewers and critics and it won multiple Primetime Emmy, Golden Globe and Screen Actors Guild Awards. From the 2004–05 through the 2008–09 television seasons, its first five seasons were rated amongst the top ten most-watched series. In 2007, it was reported to be the most popular show in its demographic worldwide, with an audience of approximately 120 million and was also reported as the third most watched television series in a study of ratings in twenty countries.

Since first appearing in Desperate Housewives, Denton continued to appear in numerous films, including: Assumption (2006), Beautiful Dreamer (2006), Undead or Alive (2007), Custody (2007), Tortured (2008) and All-Star Superman (2011). Denton also appeared in Dale Watson's music video for "Justice for All" (2007) and Phil Vassar's music video for "Bobbi with an I" (2009).

Denton portrays Dr. Sam Radford, a starring role on Hallmark Channel's fantasy comedy-drama television series Good Witch. The series follows a mother-daughter duo's magical journey as they welcome Dr. Sam Radford (Denton) and his son to town. The New York Times called the series "a gentle, sentimental prime-time fable set in an idealized Middle American small city (not an angsty suburb), is the show you find your parents or grandparents watching when you come home for a visit." In 2019, the show was one of the network's most popular original series, and the Good Witch closed season five in first place among Household rating on Sundays. The success of the series lifted the Hallmark Channel to be the highest-rated and most-watched cable network on the weekends.

In 2016, he had a recurring role as Peter Hudson on Lifetime's comedy-drama series Devious Maids. In 2018, he made a guest appearance as Navy Captain Deckard on CBS' television series NCIS: New Orleans, in the episode "Checkmate, Part 2".

Other ventures 
Denton plays guitar in the charity cover band Band from TV along with Hugh Laurie, Teri Hatcher, Greg Grunberg among others. They donate the proceeds of their performances and recordings to the charities of their choice. Band from TV has raised almost two million dollars for various causes supported by the band.

He has appeared on the cover of several magazines, including TV Guide, Tango, Orange Coast, Calabasas and Spectrum United, and pictorials for Entertainment Weekly, People, US Weekly and Life & Style. Denton has appeared in television commercials for Buick and Ford Warriors in Pink. Denton modeled for Daniel Hechter's 2012 Spring/Summer advertising campaign.

Personal life
Denton dated country music singer Deana Carter in high school. He was married to Jenna Lyn Ward from 1997 to 2000. On December 16, 2002, Denton married Erin O'Brien, a personal trainer at Life Time Fitness. They have a son born in 2003 and a daughter born in 2005. The couple previously lived in Glendale, California. After Desperate Housewives ended, the family moved to Chanhassen, Minnesota.

Denton has supported the Angel Foundation, a nonprofit organization based in Minnesota, serving adults with cancer and their families.

Filmography

References

External links

 
 

1963 births
Living people
Male actors from Tennessee
American male film actors
American male television actors
Southern Baptists
American male singers
Male actors from Fullerton, California
Male actors from Chicago
People from Nashville, Tennessee
University of Tennessee alumni
20th-century American male actors
21st-century American male actors
People from Goodlettsville, Tennessee
People from Glendale, California
People from Chanhassen, Minnesota
Baptists from Tennessee